Galina Mikhailovna Rytova (born 10 September 1975 in Moscow) is a Russian/Kazakhstani water polo player who competed  in the 2000 Summer Olympics for Russia and in the 2004 Summer Olympics for Kazakhstan.

In 2000, she won the bronze medal with the Russian team.

She participated as a part of the Kazakhstani team which was eliminated in the first round at the 2004 Summer Olympics, and participated at the 2012 Summer Olympics.

See also
 Russia women's Olympic water polo team records and statistics
 List of Olympic medalists in water polo (women)
 List of women's Olympic water polo tournament goalkeepers

References

External links
 

1975 births
Living people
Russian female water polo players
Kazakhstani female water polo players
Water polo goalkeepers
Olympic water polo players of Russia
Olympic water polo players of Kazakhstan
Water polo players at the 2000 Summer Olympics
Water polo players at the 2004 Summer Olympics
Olympic bronze medalists for Russia
Olympic medalists in water polo
Asian Games medalists in water polo
Water polo players at the 2010 Asian Games
Medalists at the 2000 Summer Olympics
Asian Games silver medalists for Kazakhstan
Medalists at the 2010 Asian Games